Standing Up (also known as Goat Island) is a 2013 American coming-of-age film written and directed by D. J. Caruso and starring Chandler Canterbury and Annalise Basso. It was based on Brock Cole's 1987 young adult novel The Goats.

Plot
Two children, Howie (Chandler Canterbury) and Grace (Annalise Basso), are stripped naked and left stranded together on an island as victims of a vicious summer camp prank. Rather than returning to camp to face the humiliation, they decide to take off on the run together. Grace does not know how to swim, so she holds onto a broken tree branch as Howie swims across the lake.

They are soon washed onto a shore near a cottage. Howie goes to the lake and spots three men headed toward the shore in a boat. He decides to take a camera and a notepad to keep track of everything they steal in order to return it to its rightful owner along with an explanation of why it was taken. They continue on their journey and encounter a group of teenagers partying and drinking near a beach. Howie grabs some money out of one of the trucks, much to Grace's disapproval. They take a break on a family beach where they purchase a hot dog and a bag of chips. They also devise a plan to steal some new clothes. As they are walking through town later that day, they spot one of their camp counselors handing out pictures of them to the locals as well as the police. They get on a bus that is rounding up a group of children for a different camp.

Their cover is almost blown when two girls Tiwana (Alexus Lapri Geier) and Lydia (Deidra Shores) confront them about taking their seats; however, Calvin (Adrian Kali Turner) convinces the girls to take other seats. Once they arrive at the camp, Howie and Grace attempt to run away, but Calvin and Tiwana catch them and convince them to spend the night at camp. Tiwana and Calvin befriend and defend Howie and Grace during their time at camp, and Tiwana makes Grace promise to call her mother (Radha Mitchell).

The next night, Howie and Grace manipulate their way into a hotel room.  The following day, they decide to hitchhike their way back to camp. Unfortunately, they encounter shady sheriff's deputy Perry Hofstadder (Val Kilmer) who lies to them and locks them in his truck. When he gets out to make a phone call, the children try to drive away. They go in the wrong direction and are forced to jump off a cliff into a lake. Grace again calls her mother who reveals the truth about Howie, saying that he's in foster care. After the phone call, Howie and Grace get into an argument. Lockwood (Frank Hoyt Taylor) informs the police about which direction the kids went. Grace spots her mother, and they run to greet each other as Howie watches in the distance. Some time later, when Grace is back home, she receives a package from Howie containing a letter and pictures of their time together. She says that Howie was adopted by a family in Connecticut, yet they still keep in touch, having seen each other the next summer to see cut-out people at a museum and going to NASA.

Cast
Annalise Basso as Shadow "Grace" Golden
Chandler Canterbury as Howie
Radha Mitchell as Meg Golden, Grace's mom
Val Kilmer as Deputy Sheriff Hofstadder
Blake Cooper Griffin as Eric 
Kate Maberly as Margo
Justin Tinucci as Butch

Production
A long-time passion project for DJ Caruso and Ken Aguado, who had both read the acclaimed novel in the early 1990s, Caruso began adapting the novel in 2000 when he and Aguado became partners in Humble Journey Films. It took another 12 years for Aguado and Caruso to find the funding the get the film produced. Made for $4 million, the film was given a limited theatrical release in August 2013.

Music
The score for the film was composed by Brian Tyler, which marks his third collaboration with Caruso, following 2008's action thriller Eagle Eye. The soundtrack was released on September 24, 2013, by Varèse Sarabande.

Reception
Rotten Tomatoes, a review aggregator, reports that 56% of nine surveyed critics gave the film a positive review; the average rating is 5.8/10.  On, Metacritic, it has a score of 40/100 based on five reviews.  Writing for the Los Angeles Times, Annlee Ellingson called it a "sanitized version of The Goats" that lacks humor or risk-taking. Writing for entertainment trade publication Daily Variety, Peter Debruge said, "Based on Brock Cole’s controversial young-adult novel “The Goats,” this low-budget passion project from “Eagle Eye” director D.J. Caruso offers a practical solution to the issue of adolescent bullying, as its two young protags respond to a case of vicious hazing not with despair or retaliation, but through teamwork and character-building."

Accolades

References

External links

2013 films
2010s coming-of-age films
American coming-of-age films
2010s English-language films
Films about summer camps
Films based on American novels
Films directed by D. J. Caruso
Films scored by Brian Tyler
Films set in 1984
Films set on islands
Films shot in Georgia (U.S. state)
2010s American films